Luminous is a collection of short science fiction stories by Greg Egan.

Contents
Luminous contains the following short stories:

"Chaff" — An agent is sent to kill a geneticist who is working in a drug lord-controlled stronghold in the jungles of Colombia, and working on important brain-altering research.
"Mitochondrial Eve" — An organisation is trying to trace a common maternal ancestor for recent humanity.
"Luminous" — A pair of researchers find a defect in mathematics, where an assertion (X) leads to a contradictory assertion (not X) after a long but finite series of steps. Using a powerful virtual computer made of light beams (Luminous), they are able to map and shape the boundary between the near-side and far-side mathematics, leading to a showdown with real consequences in the physical universe.
"Mister Volition"
"Cocoon"
"Transition Dreams"
"Silver Fire"
"Reasons to Be Cheerful" — A boy discovers he has a serious brain tumour, which was causing him to be amazingly happy. With it removed, he becomes despondent, and undergoes a new and extensive treatment eventually, with a form of brain network, to try to get back to a more useful life many years later.
"Our Lady of Chernobyl" — A man is hired to find a radioactive religious icon. The search turns deadly.
"The Planck Dive"

The title story has since seen a sequel entitled "Dark Integers".  The sequel was published in the October/November 2007 issue of Asimov's Science Fiction.

Short story collections by Greg Egan
1998 short story collections